Thomas Drozda (born 24 July 1965) is an Austrian politician and a member of the National Council. From 2016 to 2017 he was chancellery minister under the Kern government.
Since September 2018 he has been serving as managing director of the Social Democratic Party.

References

External links 
 Thomas Drozda – CV on Meine Abgeordneten

Living people
1965 births
Government ministers of Austria
Members of the National Council (Austria)
Social Democratic Party of Austria politicians
Culture ministers
21st-century Austrian politicians